Heide Bronke Fulton is an American diplomat who is the United States ambassador to Uruguay. She served as the Chargé d'affaires ad interim to Honduras from June 11, 2017 to July 12, 2019.

Early life and education 

Fulton was born in Buffalo, New York. She received a Bachelor of Arts degree from Boston College and a Master of Arts in International Relations from Troy State University.

Career 

She is a career member of the Senior Foreign Service with the rank of Minister-Counselor. Her assignments in Washington, D.C. include serving as the director of the main press office, Pearson Fellow in the Office of Senator Robert Menendez, press advisor for the Bureau of Western Hemisphere Affairs, and special assistant to the under secretary for political affairs. She also served as director of the Office of Mexican Affairs. She has served as the deputy assistant secretary of state in the Bureau of International Narcotics and Law Enforcement Affairs since August 10, 2020.

In May 2019, the day after Fulton issued a statement urging Hondurans against acts of violence, demonstrators set a fire outside the entrance to the United States Embassy.

Nomination as U.S. ambassador to Uruguay
On May 13, 2022, President Joe Biden announced his intent to nominate Fulton to be the next United States ambassador to Uruguay. On May 17, 2022, her nomination was sent to the Senate. On July 28, 2022, hearings on her nomination were held before the Senate Foreign Relations Committee. On August 3, 2022, the committee favorably reported her nomination to the Senate. On December 13, 2022, the Senate confirmed her nomination by voice vote. She was sworn in by Under Secretary Uzra Zeya on January 27, 2023, Fulton arrived in the country on February 13, 2023. She is awaiting her presentation of credentials to the president of Uruguay.

References

Living people
21st-century American diplomats
21st-century American women
Ambassadors of the United States to Honduras
American women ambassadors
Boston College alumni
Troy University alumni
United States Department of State officials
United States Foreign Service personnel
Year of birth missing (living people)
American women diplomats